Simone Mancini (born 7 January 1999) is an Italian professional footballer who plays as a forward for Serie D club Chieti.

Club career
Born in Latina, Mancini started his career in Juventus and Pescara youth sector.

He was promoted to the first team for the 2018–19 season, and was loaned to Serie C club Fano. Mancini made his professional debut on 7 November 2018 against Ternana.

On 2 February 2020, he was loaned to Maltese Premier League club Hibernians. He only played two matches after the season was canceled due COVID-19 pandemic.

On 22 September 2020, he was loaned to Serie D club Foligno.

On 13 April 2021, he joined on loan to Serie D club Recanatese for the rest of the season.

On 21 August 2021, he left Pescara and signed with Serie C club Olbia.

On 10 December 2022, Mancini signed for Chieti.

References

External links
 
 

1999 births
Living people
People from Latina, Lazio
Footballers from Lazio
Italian footballers
Association football forwards
Serie C players
Serie D players
Juventus F.C. players
Delfino Pescara 1936 players
Alma Juventus Fano 1906 players
A.S.D. Città di Foligno 1928 players
U.S.D. Recanatese 1923 players
Olbia Calcio 1905 players
Hibernians F.C. players
S.S. Chieti Calcio players
Maltese Premier League players
Italian expatriate footballers
Italian expatriate sportspeople in Malta
Expatriate footballers in Malta
Sportspeople from the Province of Latina